In Boolean algebra,  a parity function is a Boolean function whose value is one if and only if the input vector has an odd number of ones. The parity function of two inputs is also known as the XOR function.

The parity function is notable for its role in theoretical investigation of circuit complexity of Boolean functions. 

The output of the parity function is the parity bit.

Definition
The -variable parity function is the Boolean function  with the property that  if and only if the number of ones in the vector  is odd.
In other words,  is defined as follows:

where  denotes exclusive or.

Properties
Parity only depends on the number of ones and is therefore a symmetric Boolean function.

The n-variable parity function and its negation are the only Boolean functions for which all disjunctive normal forms have the maximal number of 2 n − 1 monomials of length n and all conjunctive normal forms have  the maximal number of 2 n − 1 clauses of length n.

Computational complexity
Some of the earliest work in computational complexity was 1961 bound of Bella Subbotovskaya showing the size of a Boolean formula computing parity must be at least . This work uses the method of random restrictions.

In the early 1980s, Merrick Furst, James Saxe and Michael Sipser  and independently Miklós Ajtai established super-polynomial lower bounds on the size of constant-depth Boolean circuits for the parity function, i.e., they showed that polynomial-size constant-depth circuits cannot compute the parity function. Similar results were also established for the majority, multiplication and transitive closure functions, by reduction from the parity function.

 established tight exponential lower bounds on the size of constant-depth Boolean circuits for the parity function. Håstad's Switching Lemma is the key technical tool used for these lower bounds and Johan Håstad was awarded the Gödel Prize for this work in 1994.
The precise result is that depth- circuits with AND, OR, and NOT gates require size  to compute the parity function.
This is asymptotically almost optimal as there are depth- circuits computing parity which have size .

Infinite version

It is enough to take one representative per equivalence class of relation  defined as follows:  if  and  differ at finite number of coordinates. Having such representatives, we can map all of them to 0; the rest of  values are deducted unambiguously.

Infinite parity functions are often used in theoretical Computer Science and Set Theory because of their simple definition and - on the other hand - their descriptive complexity. For example, it can be shown that an inverse image  is a non-Borel set.

See also 
Walsh function, a continuous equivalent
Parity bit, the output of the function
Piling-up lemma, a statistical property for independent inputs
Multiway switching, a physical implementation often used to control lighting

Related topics:
Error Correction
Error Detection

References

 

Boolean algebra
Circuit complexity
Functions and mappings